Tore Berger (born 11 November 1944) is a retired Norwegian sprint canoeist who mostly competed in four-man events. He won a world title in 1970, a European title in 1969, and an Olympic gold medal in 1968, placing third at the 1972 Games.

References

1944 births
Canoeists at the 1968 Summer Olympics
Canoeists at the 1972 Summer Olympics
Living people
Norwegian male canoeists
Olympic canoeists of Norway
Olympic gold medalists for Norway
Olympic bronze medalists for Norway
Olympic medalists in canoeing
ICF Canoe Sprint World Championships medalists in kayak

Medalists at the 1972 Summer Olympics
Medalists at the 1968 Summer Olympics